Cedar Hill Cemetery is a historic cemetery in the Frankford neighborhood of Philadelphia, Pennsylvania. It was established by a company incorporated on March 25, 1850.  The main gatehouse was built in 1869.

Notable interments
Alexander Crawford (1842–1886), Medal of Honor recipient.
William Walker Foulkrod (1846–1910), U.S. Representative from Pennsylvania.
George Quintus Shoch (1859–1937), major league baseball player.
John Paul Verree (1817–1889), U.S. Representative from Pennsylvania.

References

External links
Cedar Hill Cemetery at Find A Grave
Cedar Hill Cemetery at Interment.net
Photograph (1893) of gatehouse at Bryn Mawr College

Cemeteries established in the 1850s
Cemeteries in Philadelphia
1850 establishments in Pennsylvania
History of Philadelphia
Frankford, Philadelphia